Croydon is a former flag stop on the Canadian National Railway east of McBride, British Columbia. It was named after Croydon, a borough and large district in South London in England. It is approximately 10 km south of Dunster.

References

Populated places in the Regional District of Fraser-Fort George
Localities in the Regional District of Fraser-Fort George
Canadian National Railway stations in British Columbia